Cathorops festae is a species of sea catfish in the family Ariidae. It was described by George Albert Boulenger in 1898. It is known from Peru and Ecuador.

References

Ariidae
Taxa named by George Albert Boulenger
Fish described in 1898